Ronald Kammerlock is a Canadian curler.

Awards
Manitoba Curling Hall of Fame: 2008 (with all 1981 Canadian Men's Championship Team skipped by Kerry Burtnyk) Kammerlock did not show up to his induction ceremony to protest his son, Dan being cut from the 2008 Burtnyk team.

Teams

Private life
His son Dan Kammerlock is a curler too, Dan played third in Kerry Burtnyk's Manitoba team on 2008 Tim Hortons Brier.

References

External links
 
 Ron Kammerlock – Curling Canada Stats Archive

Living people
Canadian male curlers
Brier champions
Curlers from Winnipeg 
Year of birth missing (living people)